Corey Allen (born Alan Cohen; June 29, 1934 – June 27, 2010) was an American film and television director, writer, producer, and actor. He began his career as an actor but eventually became a television director. He is best known for playing the character Buzz Gunderson in Nicholas Ray's Rebel Without a Cause (1955). He is the son of Carl Cohen.

Life and career
Allen was born as Alan Cohen in Cleveland, Ohio, on June 29, 1934. He was the son of Carl and Fran Cohen; his father was an illegal bookie and gambling operator for the Mayfield Road Mob in Cleveland, and later became an important gambling executive at the Sands Hotel and Casino in Las Vegas, Nevada. Alan attended the University of California, Los Angeles, where he received his start in acting and was awarded a Bachelor of Fine Arts in 1954.

Allen was best known for his role as gang leader Buzz Gunderson in Nicholas Ray's 1955 film Rebel Without A Cause. James Dean starred as Jim Stark, a disaffected teenager who has moved to Los Angeles to start a new life, only to find more problems in his new home. After a show at the Griffith Observatory, Buzz challenges Jim to a knife fight, which Stark wins by subduing Buzz with his switchblade. During the filming of the knife fight both Allen and Dean, aficionados of method acting, used real knives and Dean was injured when Allen lunged at him with his knife. The gang challenges Jim to a chickie run, in which two stolen cars will be raced towards a cliff and the winner will be the last one to jump out. Before the two embark on their death race, Buzz and Jim stand at the edge of the cliff, looking down at the fall they might face if they remain in their cars to the end. Jim questions why they are going ahead with this race. Buzz responds, "You got to do something, don't you". Allen would later recall that his classic line was "the underlying question of each generation. Here we are: What do we do?". As the cars are heading to the cliff, Buzz attempts to jump out but is unable to escape when his leather jacket gets caught on the car door handle; he is killed in the crash on the beach below.

He appeared in some minor film roles before Rebel and afterward was seen in The Chapman Report, Darby's Rangers, Juvenile Jungle, Party Girl, Sweet Bird of Youth, in addition to guest appearances on Bonanza, Dr. Kildare, Gunsmoke, Have Gun, Will Travel and Perry Mason. In 1960 Allen played murderer Rennie Foster in "The Case of the Red Riding Boots", and in 1962 he played murder victim Lester Menke in "The Case of the Borrowed Baby".

He was actively involved in theatrical productions in the Los Angeles area, creating the touring company Freeway Circuit Inc. in 1959 and the Actors Theater in 1965. He was also involved in teaching theater at The Actors Workshop.

Allen turned to directing starting in the 1960s, where he worked on such television programs as Dallas, Hawaii Five-O, Hill Street Blues, Ironside, Mannix, Murder, She Wrote, Police Woman, The Rockford Files, Star Trek: Deep Space Nine, Star Trek: The Next Generation and The Streets of San Francisco. He won an Emmy Award, in 1984, for directing an episode of Hill Street Blues.

In 1967, Corey and his business partner Gary Stromberg met with Charles Manson early in both of their careers, as new director and cult leader respectively. Manson was invited to help them write a film treatment called Black Jesus (later produced by an Italian company in 1968) and Manson's "family" was allowed to live briefly in Corey's small acting studio on Western Ave. After Corey's then-girlfriend expressed her concerns about Manson, he broke ties with him.

He died from complications of Parkinson's disease at his home in Hollywood on June 27, 2010, two days before his 76th birthday. He is buried in grave 7-51-2 in the Sunset Slope section of Hillside Memorial Park in Los Angeles.

Filmography

As director

 The Cosby Mysteries
 Star Trek: Deep Space Nine
 episode The Maquis: Part 2
 episode Paradise
 episode The Circle
 episode Captive Pursuit
 Star Trek: The Next Generation
 episode "Journey's End"
 episode "The Game"
 episode "Final Mission"
 episode "Home Soil"
 episode "Encounter at Farpoint"
 The Search (1994)
 Men Who Hate Women & the Women Who Love Them (1994)
 Moment of Truth Stalking Back (1993)
 FBI: The Untold Stories
 Unsub
 The New Lassie
 Supercarrier
 The Ann Jillian Story (1988)
 J.J. Starbuck
 CBS Summer Playhouse
 episode Infiltrator
 Infiltrator (1987)
 Destination America (1987)
 The Last Fling (1987)
 I-Man (1986)
 Beverly Hills Cowgirl Blues (1985)
 Brass (1985)
 Code Name: Foxfire
 Code Name: Foxfire (1985)
 Otherworld
 Murder, She Wrote
 episode "Deadly Lady"
 pilot episode "The Murder of Sherlock Holmes" (1984)
 Jessie
 Hunter
 The Paper Chase
 episode "Billy Pierce"
 Hill Street Blues
 episode "Hair Apparent"
 episode "Goodbye, Mr. Scripps"
 episode "Jungle Madness"
 Legmen
 Scarecrow and Mrs. King
 episode "Always Look a Gift Horse in the Mouth"
 Whiz Kids
 episode "Programmed for Murder"
 episode "Fatal Error"
 episode "Deadly Access"
 Gavilan
 Tucker's Witch
 Matt Houston
 The Powers of Matthew Star
 Capitol
 Simon & Simon
 McClain's Law
 Magnum, P.I.
 The Return of Frank Cannon (1980)
 Stone
 The Man in the Santa Claus Suit (1979)
 The Rockford Files
 episode "No-Fault Affair"
 episode "The Man Who Saw the Alligators"
 episode "The Empty Frame"
 Trapper John, M.D.
 episode "The Shattered Image"
 Stone (1979)
 Avalanche (1978)
 Police Woman
 episode "The Young and the Fair"
 episode "Do You Still Beat Your Wife?"
 episode "The Lifeline Agency"
 episode "Broken Angels"
 Lou Grant
 Thunder and Lightning (1977)
 Yesterday's Child (1977)
 Quincy, M.E. (1976)
 Executive Suite
 Bronk
 Kate McShane
 The Family Holvak
 Cry Rape (1973)
 Police Story (1973)
 Barnaby Jones (1973)
 The Streets of San Francisco
 Ironside
 episode "But When She Was Bad"
 episode "Too Many Victims"
 See the Man Run (1971)
 Cannon
 The Erotic Adventures of Pinocchio (1971)
 The High Chaparral
 episode "A Good Sound Profit"
 Mannix
 episode "Time Out of Mind"
 episode "The Sound of Darkness"
 The New People
 Then Came Bronson
 Lancer
 episode "Child of Rock and Sunlight"
 Hawaii Five-O
 Sea Hunt (1961) Season 4, Episode 21: "Quicksand"

As actor

References

External links
 
 
 

1934 births
2010 deaths
20th-century American male actors
21st-century American male actors
American male film actors
American male screenwriters
American male television actors
American male television writers
American television directors
American television writers
Burials at Hillside Memorial Park Cemetery
Deaths from Parkinson's disease
Film directors from Ohio
Film producers from Ohio
Jewish American male actors
Male actors from Cleveland
Neurological disease deaths in California
Screenwriters from Ohio
UCLA Film School alumni